Petnica is a small village near Valjevo, Serbia. According to the census of 2002, there were 614 inhabitants (according to the census of 1991, there were 483 inhabitants).

History

Petnica was founded at the beginning of the 15th century. The oldest known written document is Petnica Psalms from 1488, which mentions not only the existence of the village of Petnica, but also the monastery and school there. The Turks burned the monastery in the 18th century, but the church, last renovated in 1864, is still standing. When digging foundations for building stations, excavators discovered the remains of the old cemetery in Petnica ("Bobija") that were transferred to today's church. Today, in the back yard of a large research station in Petnica, there are still two of the three school buildings raised in 1925.

Features 

The village is notable for: 
 Petnica Cave, a cave and archaeological site. The cave and its immediate surroundings are the oldest evidence of the life of people in western Serbia. Archaeological research of the site began in the 19th century when the first research was performed by Josif Pančić and Jovan Cvijić. In addition to archaeological value, the cave has great speleological and paleontological value. The cave consists of a nearly 600-metre-long channel and a number of chambers. It is divided into two parts – Upper and Lower cave. 	
Archaeological site Petnica, аrchaeological-anthropological research conducted in 1969 confirmed that the archaeological site which is located in front of the entrance to the cave Petnica, is the first complete neolithic habitat in Serbia, some 6,000 years old. The second site, discovered inside the cave, contained the fire pit, bones of Cave bear, Hyena, buck, and parts of military equipment from the Romans (including a game to play), and remains of medieval refuge of the local population. Material from explorations and excavation of the cave contained number of weapons and the remains of pottery dishes that were used by neolithic people.
 Petnica lake Pocibrava, a meeting place for swimmers and fishermen. 

 Petnica Science Center
 Petnica Swimming Pool Complex
 Water bottling plant

Gallery

External links

Petnica Science Centre
Petnica on Valjevo za vas

Populated places in Kolubara District
Caves of Serbia